Arrowe Park Hospital is a large, acute hospital, located on a 15-acre (6.1 ha) section of Arrowe Park, close to the village of Upton, Wirral, Merseyside. It is one of three hospitals managed by Wirral University Teaching Hospital NHS Foundation Trust, the others being Clatterbridge Hospital and Wirral Women and Children's Hospital, the latter of which is also based on the Arrowe Park site.

Preliminary inspection by the Care Quality Commission rated the hospital as requiring improvement.

History
Planning for Arrowe Park Hospital began in the 1960s, although building did not start until the late 1970s. The facility was built to replace Birkenhead General Hospital in Birkenhead, Highfield Maternity Hospital in Wallasey, Leasowe Hospital in Leasowe, St Catherine's Hospital in Birkenhead and Victoria Central Hospital in Wallasey. The hospital was officially opened by the Queen on 4 May 1982.

In March 2011, following remodelling work at a cost of £11.5 million, the maternity and gynaecology unit was renamed Wirral Women and Children's Hospital.

Coronavirus quarantine centre
In January 2020, the hospital was designated the quarantine site for British nationals evacuated from China during the COVID-19 pandemic. The British nationals from Wuhan were all released from quarantine after 14 days and none became ill. British citizens who had been quarantined on the Diamond Princess cruise liner were also scheduled to be quarantined at Arrowe Park Hospital.

References

External links

Official site

Hospital buildings completed in 1982
Hospitals in Merseyside
1982 establishments in England
NHS hospitals in England